Thorismund (also Thorismod or Thorismud, as manuscripts of our chief source confusingly attest) ( 420–453), became king of the Visigoths after his father Theodoric was killed in the Battle of the Catalaunian Plains (also called Battle of Châlons) in 451 CE. He was murdered in 453 and was succeeded by his brother Theodoric II.

Biography
Thorismund appears to have played a pivotal role in the Battle of Châlons as he led a contingent of the Visigoth forces in capturing an important summit at the very early stages of the conflict. The summit seems to have extended to the whole of the left flank of the Ostrogoth and Hun forces. Thorismund descended from the hills during the late stages of the conflict, when the Huns had prevailed over the Alans, and the Ostrogoths were pushing the disorganized Visigoths after the death of their king Theodoric. Thorismund led his force of Visigoths in a decisive charge which, according to Edward Gibbon, flanked both the Ostrogoths and subsequently the Huns and snatched the victory from his enemies.

References

External links

 Edward Gibbon, History of the Decline and Fall of the Roman Empire, chapter 35

Balt dynasty
Assassinated Gothic people
Gothic warriors
453 deaths
5th-century murdered monarchs
5th-century Visigothic monarchs
Year of birth unknown